Circumferential Highway may refer to one of the following beltways/orbital roads/ring roads:

Barbados
The ABC Highway, roughly defines the boundary of metropolitan capital city Bridgetown.

Canada 

  Nova Scotia Highway 111, known as the Dartmouth Circumferential Highway ("The Circ")
Manitoba Highway 100 and 101, an orbital highway that circles Winnipeg, known as the Perimeter Highway.  The southern portion (Hwy 100), is a four-lane divided highway that makes up the bypass route of the Trans-Canada Highway, and is heavily travelled.  Much of it has been upgraded to freeway standards, but there remain several at-grade signalized intersections.  The northern portion (Hwy 101), is a mix of two-lane and four-lane divided highway, with a most intersections being grade-separated.  An incomplete Turbo Interchange currently exists at Hwy 101 and Lagimodiere (Hwy 59).

Italy 

A90, known as the G.R.A. or Grande Raccordo Anulare ("Great Ring Road")

Philippines

There are 6 Circumferential Roads in the Metro Manila area of the Philippines. See Major roads in Metro Manila.

Puerto Rico

  Puerto Rico Highway 9, known as Ponce's Rafael (Churumba) Cordero Santiago Circumferential Highway, the Circumferential Highway of Ponce, Puerto Rico

United States

 Circumferential Highway (Nashua), a partially built unnumbered bypass route around Nashua, New Hampshire, that has only been built as a short east-west connector road between U.S. 3/the Everett Turnpike in Nashua and Route 3A in Hudson, with one intersection at the Daniel Webster Highway in Nashua
  Massachusetts Route 128, originally known as (and sometimes still known as) the Circumferential Highway around Boston; most of it is concurrent with Interstate 95 or Interstate 93; the latter portion is no longer posted with 128 signage
  Vermont Route 289, the Chittenden County Circumferential Highway
  Interstate 495 around Washington, D.C. was known as the Circumferential Highway during its planning
 Interstate 465 around Indianapolis